The following is a list of prominent people who were born in or have lived in the Malaysian state of Kelantan, or for whom Kelantan is a significant part of their identity.

A
 Ahmad Muin Yaacob – convicted murderer
 Asri Muda – politician, born in Kota Bharu

B

C

D

E

F
Fizo Omar - Actor, born in Kota Bharu

G

H

I

J

K

L

M
 Mustapa Mohamed – politician, born in Bachok

N
 Nelydia Senrose – actress, born in Kota Bharu
 Nik Safiah Karim – linguist, born in Kota Bharu

O

P

Q

R
Rozman Jusoh – odd-job labourer, convicted drug trafficker

S

T

 Tan Seng Giaw – politician, born in Kota Bharu
 Tengku Razaleigh Hamzah - politician, born in Kota Bharu

U

V

X

Y

Z

References

 
Kelantan